M. salicifolia may refer to:
 Magnolia salicifolia, the willow-leafed magnolia or anise magnolia, a tree species native to Japan
 Manihot salicifolia, a plant species in the genus Manihot
 Meryta salicifolia, a plant species endemic to French Polynesia
 Miconia salicifolia, a plant species in the genus Miconia
 Mida salicifolia, the willow-leaved maire or maire taike, a plant species in the genus Mida and the family Santalaceae
 Mollinedia salicifolia, a plant species in the genus Mollinedia
 Monnina salicifolia, a plant species in the genus Monnina
 Morella salicifolia, a plant species in the genus Morella
 Myrcia salicifolia, a synonym for Myrcia sphaerocarpa

See also
 Salicifolia (disambiguation)